The Reader is a 2008 romantic drama film directed by Stephen Daldry and written by David Hare, based on the 1995 German novel of the same name by Bernhard Schlink. It stars Kate Winslet, Ralph Fiennes, and David Kross. It was the last film for producers Anthony Minghella and Sydney Pollack, both of whom died prior to its release.  Production began in Germany in September 2007, and the film opened in limited release on December 10, 2008.

The film tells the story of Michael Berg, a German lawyer who, as a 15-year-old in 1958, has a sexual relationship with an older woman, Hanna Schmitz. She disappears only to resurface years later as one of the defendants in a war crimes trial stemming from her actions as a guard at a Nazi concentration camp. Michael realizes that Hanna is keeping a personal secret she believes is worse than her Nazi past – a secret which, if revealed, could help her at the trial. Some historians criticised the film for making Schmitz an object of the audience's sympathy and accused the filmmakers of Holocaust revisionism.

Although it received mixed reviews, Winslet and Kross, who plays the young Michael, received acclaim for their performances; Winslet won a number of awards for her role, including the Academy Award for Best Actress. The film was nominated for several other major awards, including the Academy Award for Best Picture.

Plot

In 1995 Berlin, Michael Berg watches a train pass, flashing back to a tram ride from 1958. Michael, 15, feels sick, getting off the tram to walk in the rain. Vomiting beside an apartment building, tram conductor Hanna Schmitz, 36, finds him, cleans him up and helps him home. Michael is diagnosed with scarlet fever.

Michael visits Hanna with flowers once he is better, and they proceed to have a summer affair. She asks him to read to her from his school books. On a bicycle trip, they visit a church with a choir and Hanna is emotional. Toward the end of summer, Hanna is promoted to the tram's head offices, they argue, she sends him away, packs her things and leaves. When Michael finds her apartment vacant he is devastated.

Again in 1995, Michael is reserved around women, divorced, and estranged from his daughter.

In 1966, a Heidelberg University Law School student, Michael observes a trial (similar to the Frankfurt Auschwitz trials) of several former SS guards accused of letting 300 Jewish women and children perish in a burning church during the death march near Kraków, Poland. Michael is horrified to see that Hanna is one of the defendants. Ilana Mather and her mother Rose give the key evidence. Ilana testifies that Hanna had women from the camp read to her in the evenings. Rose testifies that when the church caught fire from a bombing raid, as the guards locked the doors, all but her and Ilana died.

Hanna, unlike her co-defendants, admits that Auschwitz was an extermination camp and that she and the others chose 10 women for each month's Selektion. When questioned on the church fire, no one explained why they had not unlocked the doors. The guards' report said they did not know about it until morning. Hanna admitted it was a lie, they had not opened the doors so the prisoners could not escape. 

Hanna's co-defendants then all lie that she was in charge, and that she wrote the report. Hanna denies this, insisting that all the guards present agreed on the contents of the report. The lead judge asks for a handwriting sample, ashamed, she avoids this test by testifying she wrote the report. Watching the trial from the public gallery, Michael realizes Hanna's secret: she is illiterate, and so she could not have read or written it.

When Michael tells his law professor, he tells him his moral obligation is to inform the court. The professor is frustrated with him for not having spoken to Hanna, so he tries to visit her in prison, but cannot face her and leaves her waiting. She gets a life sentence for 300 murder cases, while the other defendants are sentenced to four years and three months each for aiding and abetting. Michael weeps from the gallery.

Years later, Michael puts the books he had read to Hanna on tape and regularly sends them to her in prison. She borrows the same books from the prison library, teaching herself to read and write using Michael's voice. She writes to Michael, gradually with more and more literacy, but he never responds.

In 1988, a prison official contacts Michael, requesting his help with Hanna's transition into society following her release. Initially refusing, he later visits to say he has found her a place and a job. Pleased to see him, she tries to reconnect, but Michael is distant. He asks if she thinks about the past and Hanna asks if he means their past. When he says he means the war, she says what she feels and thinks does not matter as, "The dead are still dead." Both are left upset.

Michael arrives at the prison with flowers on Hanna's release day, but is told she has hanged herself. She left a crude will, gifting a tea tin with cash and the money in her bank account to Ilana.

Michael finds Ilana in New York City, admitting his connection to Hanna and its long-lasting impact. He tells her about Hanna's illiteracy, but she tells him to seek catharsis elsewhere. Michael tells her what she left her, showing her the tea tin, but Ilana refuses the money. He suggests it be donated to a Jewish literacy organization in Hanna's name, and Ilana agrees he should do it if he wishes. She keeps the tin, as it is like one she once had.

The film ends in 1995 with Michael driving his daughter Julia to Hanna's grave, telling her their story.

Cast

Production
In April 1998 Miramax Films acquired the rights to the novel The Reader, and principal photography began in September 2007 immediately after Stephen Daldry was signed to direct the film adaptation and Fiennes was cast in a lead role.  Winslet was originally cast as Hanna, but scheduling difficulties with Revolutionary Road led her to leave the film and Nicole Kidman was cast as her replacement. In January 2008, Kidman left the project, citing her recent pregnancy as the primary reason. She had not filmed any scenes yet, so the studio was able to recast Winslet without affecting the production schedule.

Filming took place in Berlin, Görlitz, on the Kirnitzschtal tramway near Bad Schandau, and finished in the MMC Studios Köln in Cologne on July 14. Filmmakers received $718,752 from Germany's Federal Film Board.  Overall, the studio received $4.1 million from Germany's regional and federal subsidiaries.

Schlink insisted the film be shot in English rather than German, as it posed questions about living in a post-genocide society that went beyond mid-century Germany. Daldry and Hare toured locations from the novel with Schlink, viewed documentaries about that period in German history, and read books and articles about women who had served as SS guards in the camps. Hare, who rejected using a voiceover narration to render the long internal monologues in the novel, also changed the ending so that Michael starts to tell the story of Hanna and him to his daughter. "It's about literature as a powerful means of communication, and at other times as a substitute for communication", he explained. The filming of sex scenes with Kross and Winslet were delayed until Kross turned 18.

The primary cast, all of whom were German besides Fiennes, Olin, and Winslet, decided to emulate Kross's accent since he had just learned English for the film. Chris Menges replaced Roger Deakins as cinematographer. One of the film's producers, Scott Rudin, left the production over a dispute about the rushed editing process to ensure a 2008 release date and had his name removed from the credit list. Rudin differed with Harvey Weinstein "because he didn't want to campaign for an Oscar along with Doubt and Revolutionary Road, which also stars Winslet." Winslet won the Best Actress Academy Award for The Reader. Marc Caro wrote, "Because Winslet couldn't get Best Actress nominations for both movies, the Weinstein Co. shifted her to supporting actress for The Reader as a courtesy..." but that it is "...up to [the voters] to place the name in the category that they think is appropriate to the performance", resulting in her receiving more Best Actress nomination votes for this film than the Best Actress submission of her Revolutionary Road performance. Winslet's head-to-head performances also won the Golden Globe Award for Best Actress for Revolutionary Road and Golden Globe Award for Best Supporting Actress for The Reader.

Entertainment Weekly reported that to "age Hanna from cool seductress to imprisoned war criminal, Winslet endured seven and a half hours of makeup and prosthetic prep each day."

Lisa Schwarzbaum of Entertainment Weekly writes that "Ralph Fiennes has perhaps the toughest job, playing the morose adult Michael – a version, we can assume, of the author. Fiennes masters the default demeanor of someone perpetually pained."

Release
On December 10, 2008 The Reader had a limited release at 8 theaters and grossed $168,051 at the domestic box office in its opening weekend. The film had its wide release on January 30, 2009 and grossed $2,380,376 at the domestic box office. The film's widest release was at 1,203 theaters on February 27, 2009, the weekend after the Oscar win for Kate Winslet.

In total, the film has grossed $34,194,407 at the domestic box office and $108,901,967 worldwide.  The film was released on DVD in the U.S. on April 14, 2009 and April 28 on Blu-ray. Both versions were released in the UK on May 25, 2009. In Germany two DVD versions (single disc and 2-disc special edition) and Blu-ray were released on September 4, 2009.

Reception

Critical response
On Rotten Tomatoes, the film holds an approval rating of 63% based on 204 reviews, with an average rating of 6.4/10. The site's consensus states, "Despite Kate Winslet's superb portrayal, The Reader suggests an emotionally distant, Oscar-baiting historical drama." At Metacritic the film was assigned a weighted average score of 58 out of 100, based on 38 critics, indicating "mixed or average reviews".

Ann Hornaday of The Washington Post wrote, "This engrossing, graceful adaptation of Bernhard Schlink's semi-autobiographical novel has been adapted by screenwriter David Hare and director Stephen Daldry with equal parts simplicity and nuance, restraint and emotion. At the center of a skein of vexing ethical questions, Winslet delivers a tough, bravura performance as a woman whose past coincides with Germany's most cataclysmic and hauntingly unresolved era."

Manohla Dargis of The New York Times wrote, "You have to wonder who, exactly, wants or perhaps needs to see another movie about the Holocaust that embalms its horrors with artfully spilled tears and asks us to pity a death-camp guard. You could argue that the film isn’t really about the Holocaust, but about the generation that grew up in its shadow, which is what the book insists. But the film is neither about the Holocaust nor about those Germans who grappled with its legacy: it's about making the audience feel good about a historical catastrophe that grows fainter with each new tasteful interpolation."

Patrick Goldstein wrote in the Los Angeles Times,  "The picture's biggest problem is that it simply doesn't capture the chilling intensity of its source material," and noted there was a "largely lackluster early reaction" to the film by most film critics. Most felt that while the novel portrayed Hanna's illiteracy as a metaphor for generational illiteracy about the Holocaust, the film failed to convey those thematic overtones.

Ron Rosenbaum was critical of the film's fixation on Hanna's illiteracy, saying, "so much is made of the deep, deep exculpatory shame of illiteracy – despite the fact that burning 300 people to death doesn't require reading skills – that some worshipful accounts of the novel (by those who buy into its ludicrous premise, perhaps because it's been declared "classic" and "profound") actually seem to affirm that illiteracy is something more to be ashamed of than participating in mass murder ... Lack of reading skills is more disgraceful than listening in bovine silence to the screams of 300 people as they are burned to death behind the locked doors of a church you're guarding to prevent them from escaping the flames. Which is what Hanna did, although, of course, it's not shown in the film."

Kirk Honeycutt's review in The Hollywood Reporter was more generous, concluding the picture was a "well-told coming-of-age yarn" but "disturbing" for raising critical questions about complicity in the Holocaust. He praised Winslet and Kross for providing "gutsy, intense performances", noted that Olin and Ganz turn in "memorable appearances", and noted that the cinematographers, Chris Menges and Roger Deakins, lent the film a "fine professional polish". Colm Andrew of the Manx Independent also rated the film highly and observed it had "countless opportunities to become overly sentimental or dramatic and resists every one of them, resulting in a film which by its conclusion, has you not knowing which quality to praise the most".

At The Huffington Post, Thelma Adams found the relationship between Hanna and Michael, which she termed abusive, more disturbing than any of the historical questions in the movie: "Michael is a victim of abuse, and his abuser just happened to have been a luscious retired Auschwitz guard. You can call their tryst and its consequences a metaphor of two generations of Germans passing guilt from one to the next, but that doesn't explain why filmmakers Daldry and Hare luxuriated in the sex scenes – and why it's so tastefully done audiences won't see it for the child pornography it is."

When asked to respond, Hare called it "the most ridiculous thing ... We went to great lengths to make sure that that's exactly what it didn't turn into. The book is much more erotic." Daldry added, "He's a young man who falls in love with an older woman who is complicated, difficult and controlling. That's the story."

The film appeared on several critics' top ten lists of the best films of 2008. Rex Reed of The New York Observer named it the second best film of 2008. Stephen Farber of The Hollywood Reporter named it the fourth best film of 2008, Tasha Robinson of The A.V. Club named it the eighth best film of 2008, and Roger Ebert of the Chicago Sun-Times placed it on his unranked top 20 list.

Special praise went to Winslet's acting; she then swept the main prizes in the 2008/2009 award season, including the Golden Globe, the Critic's Choice Award, the Screen Actor's Guild Award, the BAFTA, and the Academy Award for Best Actress.

Several writers noted that her success seemed to have made real her appearance in the BBC comedy Extras, in which she played a fictionalized version of herself desperate to win an Academy Award. In the episode, Winslet decided to increase her chance of winning an Oscar by starring in a film about the Holocaust, noting that such films were often awarded Oscars. However, in the fictional film, Winslet played a nun sheltering children from the Holocaust rather than one of its perpetrators. Winslet commented that the similarity "would be funny", but the connection didn't occur to her until "midway through shooting the film...this was never a Holocaust movie to me. That's part of the story and provides something of a backdrop, and sets the scene. But to me it was always an extraordinarily unconventional love story."

Awards and nominations

References

External links
 
 
 
 

2008 films
2000s English-language films
English-language German films
2000s German-language films
Greek-language films
Latin-language films
2008 romantic drama films
2000s coming-of-age drama films
American coming-of-age drama films
American courtroom films
American romantic drama films
BAFTA winners (films)
Babelsberg Studio films
German coming-of-age drama films
German courtroom films
German romantic drama films
Films about the aftermath of the Holocaust
Films based on German novels
Films directed by Stephen Daldry
Films featuring a Best Actress Academy Award-winning performance
Films featuring a Best Supporting Actress Golden Globe-winning performance
Films produced by Sydney Pollack
Films scored by Nico Muhly
Films set in Berlin
Films set in Heidelberg
Films set in Germany
Films set in 1958
Films set in 1966
Films set in the 1970s
Films set in 1988
Films shot in Berlin
Films shot in Cologne
Films shot in Germany
Films set in West Germany
Films set in 1995
The Weinstein Company films
2000s American films
2000s German films